Megan McArdle (born January 29, 1973) is an American journalist, columnist, and blogger based in Washington, D.C. She writes for The Washington Post, mostly about economics, finance, and government policy.

She began her writing career with a blog, "Live From The WTC," started in November 2001. In 2003 The Economist hired her to write for their website, and since then she has worked full-time as a journalist and editor, both online and in print. McArdle is currently an opinion writer for The Washington Post. Other publications she has worked for include The Atlantic, Newsweek, The Daily Beast, and Bloomberg View. She has also published book reviews and opinion pieces in the New York Post, The New York Sun, Reason, The Guardian, and Salon.

Early life and education 
McArdle was born and raised in New York City. Her father, Francis X. McArdle, was former managing director of the GCA (General Contractors Association of New York) during the Koch, Dinkins, and Giuliani administrations. Her mother, Joan McArdle, was a real estate broker for Prudential Douglas Elliman.

McArdle attended high school at Riverdale Country School. Afterwards, she graduated from the University of Pennsylvania, where she received a B.A. in English literature. She then earned an MBA from University of Chicago's Booth School of Business.

During her junior year of college, she worked as a canvasser for the Public Interest Research Groups, the nonprofit founded by Ralph Nader. Her experience there hurried along her "transition from ultraliberal to libertarian." The organization was, she later wrote, "the most deceptive, evil place I've ever worked."

Career 

Dave Weigel called McArdle "the original blogger-turned-MSM journo". In 2012, David Brooks called McArdle one of the most influential bloggers on the right.

McArdle began blogging in November 2001 with a blog called "Live From The WTC," which arose from her employment with a construction firm involved in cleanup at the World Trade Center site following the September 11 attacks. She wrote under the pen name "Jane Galt," playing on the name "John Galt," a central character in Ayn Rand's Objectivist novel Atlas Shrugged. In November 2002 she renamed the site "Asymmetrical Information," a reference to the economics term of the same name. That blog had two other occasional contributors, Zimran Ahmed (writing under the pen name "Winterspeak"), and the pseudonymous "Mindles H. Dreck."

McArdle gained some online attention in May 2003 for coining what she termed "Jane's Law" in a blog post discussing political behaviors. The law, written with regard to the two main U.S. political parties, Republicans and Democrats, reads: "The devotees of the party in power are smug and arrogant. The devotees of the party out of power are insane."

McCardle was an outspoken supporter of the Iraq War both before and after the invasion by the United States.  She later made a partial admission of error for this position 

Another post by McArdle, from April 2005, discusses why she takes no position on the issue of same-sex marriage. She wrote: "All I'm asking for is for people to think more deeply than a quick consultation of their imaginations to make that decision... This humility is what I want from liberals when approaching market changes; now I'm asking it from my side [libertarians], in approaching social ones."

In 2003 McArdle was hired by The Economist to write for their website, in the "Countries" and "News" sections, and in October 2006 she founded The Economists "Free Exchange" blog.

In August 2007 McArdle left The Economist and moved to Washington, D.C., to work as a full-time blogger for The Atlantic, keeping "Asymmetrical Information" as her blog's name.

In 2009, she criticized an article in Playboy by eXile Online editors Mark Ames and Yasha Levine which detailed the influence of the Koch brothers in American and Tea Party politics. Playboy took down the article as a result of the negative response.

By 2010, McArdle had also become The Atlantics business and economics editor. In February 2010, her blog lost the title "Asymmetrical Information," as The Atlantic switched to having every blog (except Andrew Sullivan's The Daily Dish) be identified solely by its author.

She was a Bernard L. Schwartz fellow at the public policy think tank New America.

In June 2012, McArdle left The Atlantic, and began writing for Newsweek/The Daily Beast.

In June 2013, McArdle announced that she was departing Newsweek to join Bloomberg View as a columnist.

McArdle is an occasional television and radio commentator, having appeared on The Kudlow Report, Fareed Zakaria GPS, and American Public Media's Marketplace.

McArdle joined The Washington Post as an opinion columnist in March 2018.

Views 

McArdle has described herself as a "right-leaning libertarian." David Brooks categorized her as part of a group of bloggers who "start from broadly libertarian premises but do not apply them in a doctrinaire way."

Ron Paul 

McArdle has been critical of the libertarian politician Ron Paul, taking him to task for not strongly disavowing racist statements that appeared in his newsletters, arguing against his championing of tax credits, and accusing him of lacking specificity about cutting government spending. McArdle was also quoted as saying that Ron Paul "doesn't understand anything about monetary policy," and that "he wastes all of his time on the House Financial Services Committee ranting crazily."

U.S. automotive bailout 
In late 2008, McArdle wrote extensively against a proposed federal bailout of the U.S. auto industry (which ultimately occurred in early 2009). In November 2008, various of McArdle's blog posts on the subject were quoted approvingly by conservative commentators David Brooks, Michael Barone and John Podhoretz, among others.

Nationalized health care 
Since 2009, McArdle has argued extensively against instituting a system of national health insurance in the United States, and specifically against the federal health care reform bill the Patient Protection and Affordable Care Act, which was signed into law in March 2010. In addition to a number of blog posts on the subject, she also wrote an article, "Myth Diagnosis," in the March 2010 Atlantic.

In a July 2009 blog post, McArdle listed two reasons that she objected to such a system: first, that it would stifle innovation, because "Monopolies are not innovative, whether they are public or private," and second, that "Once the government gets into the business of providing our health care, the government gets into the business of deciding whose life matters, and how much." Commentator Ezra Klein of The Washington Post criticized this post, writing, "In 1,600 words, she doesn't muster a single link to a study or argument, nor a single number that she didn't make up (what numbers do exist come in the form of thought experiments and assumptions). Megan's argument against national health insurance boils down to a visceral hatred of the government."

In an August 2009 post, McArdle reiterated, "My objection is primarily, as I've said numerous times, that the government will destroy innovation. It will do this by deciding what constitutes an acceptable standard of care, and refusing to fund treatment above that. It will also start controlling prices."

In a comment to that post, McArdle stated, "The United States currently provides something like 80–90% of the profits on new drugs and medical devices. Perhaps you think you can slash profits 80% with no effect on the behavior of the companies that make these products. I don't." In a subsequent Washington Post online chat, a commenter asked her, "You said that medical innovation will be wiped out if we have a type of national health care, because European drug companies get 80% of their revenue from Americans. Where did you get this statistic?" McArdle responded that it was "a hypothetical, not a statistic." This was criticized in a blog post in The New Republic. In response to this criticism, McArdle stated that she had misunderstood the question, and "thought the commenter was referring to the postulated hypothetical destruction of all US profits." She also stated that, though "there are no hard numbers available," she estimated that the U.S. contribution to pharmaceutical profits was at least 60%.

Personal life 

McArdle married Peter Suderman, an associate editor for the libertarian magazine Reason, in 2010.

She was a vegan for a year in 2008, which she ended due to the diet complicating management of her previously diagnosed Hashimoto's thyroiditis.

Bibliography

 The Up Side of Down: Why Failing Well Is the Key to Success

References

External links 

 McArdle's archive at the Washington Post
 McArdle's column at Bloomberg View 
 McArdle's blog at The Daily Beast (September 2012 – June 2013)
 McArdle's blog at TheAtlantic.com (August 2007 – June 2012)
 Jane Galt – Asymmetrical Information (2001–2008) Internet Archive version
 Fellows Program at New America
 Video debates featuring McArdle on Bloggingheads.tv
 
 Appearances on EconTalk podcast
 Interview with McArdle
 Remarks at America’s Future Foundation panel discussion

1973 births
Living people
American women bloggers
American bloggers
American libertarians
The Atlantic (magazine) people
The Washington Post people
University of Chicago Booth School of Business alumni
University of Pennsylvania alumni
Journalists from Washington, D.C.
American women journalists
The Economist people
Journalists from New York City
21st-century American journalists
21st-century American women writers
New America (organization)
Riverdale Country School alumni